Żelechowa is a municipal neighbourhood of the city of Szczecin, Poland situated on the left bank of Oder river, north of the Szczecin Old Town and Middle Town. As of January 2011 it had a population of 13,971.

Before 1945 when Stettin was a part of Germany, the German name of this suburb was Stettin-Zūllchow.

References 

Neighbourhoods of Szczecin